Velden am Wörthersee (Slovene: Vrba na Koroškem) is a market town in Villach-Land District, in the Austrian state of Carinthia. Situated on the western shore of the Wörthersee lake, it is one of the country's most popular holiday resorts.

Geography
The municipal area of Velden is subdivided into eight Katastralgemeinden (cadastral communities): Augsdorf, Duel, Kerschdorf ob Velden, Köstenberg, Latschach an der Drau, Lind ob Velden, St. Egyden, and Velden am Wörther See – which include 30 villages:

 Aich (Dob)
 Augsdorf (Loga Vas)
 Bach (Potok) 
 Dieschitz (Deščice) 
 Dröschitz (Trešiče) 
 Duel (Dole) 
 Fahrendorf 
 Göriach (Gorje) 
 Kantnig (Konatiče) 
 Kerschdorf (Črešnje) 
 Köstenberg (Kostanje) 
 Kranzlhofen (Dvor)
 Latschach (Loče)
 Lind ob Velden (Lipa) 
 Oberdorf (Zgornja vas)
 Oberjeserz (Zgornje Jezerce) 
 Oberwinklern (Vogliče) 
 Pulpitsch (Polpače) 
 Rajach (Sreje) 
 Saisserach (Zajzare) 
 St. Egyden (Šentilj)
 Selpritsch (Žoprače)
 Sonnental 
 Sternberg (Šentjurij na Strmcu) 
 Treffen (Trebinja)
 Unterjeserz (Spodnje Jezerce) 
 Unterwinklern (Spodnje Vogliče) 
 Velden am Wörther See (Vrba) 
 Weinzierl (Vinare) 
 Wurzen (Koren)

History

Originally a mansio on the Roman road between Villach (Sanctium) and Virunum, it was first mentioned in a 1263 deed as Campus (field, pasture - German: Feld) and in 1410 as Velben. In medieval times it belonged to the estates of the Hohenwart Castle, seat of the Counts of Celje, the Counts of Ortenburg, the Knightly Order of Saint George in Millstatt Abbey, and finally the Austrian House of Habsburg.

In 1545, the Protestant Khevenhüller noble family had acquired the lands of Landskron and Velden, where Bartlmä Khevenhüller (1539–1613) from 1585 had a Renaissance manor house built. His descendants were expelled from the Habsburg lands in the course of the Counter-Reformation in 1639, and the castle then fell to the noble House of Dietrichstein. Decayed and demolished by a fire, it was rebuilt in 1892 as a hotel called Schloss Velden. Later an estate of Gunter Sachs, it was the filming location for the popular 1990-1992 German-Austrian TV series Ein Schloß am Wörthersee starring Schlager singer Roy Black.

Politics
Seats in the municipal assembly (Gemeinderat) as of 2009 elections:
Social Democratic Party of Austria (SPÖ): 14
Freedom Party in Carinthia (FPÖ): 7
Austrian People's Party (ÖVP): 5
Unity List: 1

Image gallery

Twin towns — sister cities

Velden am Wörthersee is twinned with:
 Bled, Slovenia, since 2004
 Gemona del Friuli, Italy
 Jesolo, Italy, since 2006

References

External links

Schloss Velden official website
Hotel Ogris am See official website | Family-run design hotel at the lakeside
 Holiday in Velden am Wörthersee | Info website for tourists

Cities and towns in Villach-Land District